In cloud computing, the term zero-knowledge (or occasionally no-knowledge or zero access) refers to an online service that stores, transfers or manipulates data in a way that maintains a high level of confidentiality, where the data is only accessible to the data's owner (the client), and not to the service provider. This is achieved by encrypting the raw data at the client's side or end-to-end (in case there is more than one client), without disclosing the password to the service provider. This means that neither the service provider, nor any third party that might intercept the data, can decrypt and access the data without prior permission, allowing the client a higher degree of privacy than would otherwise be possible. In addition, zero-knowledge services often strive to hold as little metadata as possible, holding only that data that is functionally needed by the service.

The term "zero-knowledge" was popularized by backup service SpiderOak, which later switched to using the term "no knowledge" to avoid confusion with the computer science concept of zero-knowledge proof.

Providers of zero-knowledge services include:
 Cubbit
 Bitwarden
 LucidLink
 NordPass
 NordLocker
 ProtonMail
 Signal
 SpiderOak
 Sync.com
 Tresorit
 Tarsnap

Disadvantages 
Most cloud storage services keep a copy of the client's password on their servers, allowing clients who have lost their passwords to retrieve and decrypt their data using alternative means of authentication; but since zero-knowledge services do not store copies of clients' passwords, if a client loses their password then their data cannot be decrypted, making it practically unrecoverable.

Most cloud storage services are also able to furnish access requests from law enforcement agencies for similar reasons; zero-knowledge services, however, are unable to do so, since their systems are designed to make clients' data inaccessible without the client's explicit cooperation.

References 

Privacy
Computer security
Backup software
Secure communication
Internet terminology